Charles Graham van der Gucht (born 14 January 1980 in Hammersmith, London) was an English cricketer. He was a left-handed batsman and a left-arm slow bowler who played first-class and one-day cricket for Hampshire between 1999 and 2000.

Van der Gucht had originally played for Hampshire's Second XI during the 1997 Second XI Championship and, two years later, in the Second XI Trophy, where in the first year of the competition he guided his team to the final, despite the team losing to Kent at the climax of the competition.

Van der Gucht played in the 1999 38-County Cup for Hampshire Cricket Board, and later in the season, in the first three rounds of the NatWest Trophy. Van der Gucht was a tailend batsman for the Second XI, whose persistence with the bat was not to show through on his first-class debut, though he impressed with the ball, taking three wickets in a four-day draw against a team of Zimbabweans touring the country during the year.

Van der Gucht was quickly out of the team, though he continued to play for a brief period in the Second XI. His final first-class appearance, for Durham UCCE, ended in a draw, in which van der Gucht batted soundly, though his form with the bat was not to be matched by his performance with the ball, taking one wicket at a heavy run-per-over rate.

Van der Gucht retired from all forms of cricket in 2003 having failed to fully recover from a serious traffic collision two years previously in which he broke both his legs.

Van der Gucht's grandfather, Paul van der Gucht, was a first-class cricketer between 1932 and 1947, who played for Gloucestershire and Bengal.

External links
Charles van der Gucht at Cricket Archive 

1980 births
English cricketers
Living people
Hampshire cricketers
Hampshire Cricket Board cricketers
Durham MCCU cricketers
Alumni of Durham University
People from Hammersmith
People educated at Radley College